Rundle is an English surname, perhaps in some cases originating in the Rundale agriculture system.

Rundle may also refer to:

Rundle Academy, Calgary, Alberta, Canada
Rundle, Calgary, a neighbourhood in Calgary, Alberta, Canada
Rundle (C-Train), a light rail transit station in Calgary, Alberta, Canada
Mount Rundle, a mountain in Banff National Park, Alberta, Canada
East End of Rundle, easternmost extension of the Mount Rundle massif
Rundle Heights, Edmonton, a neighbourhood in Edmonton, Alberta, Canada
Rundle Park (Edmonton), Alberta, Canada
Rundle Park, Adelaide, Australia
Rundle Street, a street in Adelaide, Australia
Rundle Mall, a shopping mall in Adelaide, Australia
Rundle Range National Park, a park in Queensland, Australia
Runnel Stone, a pinnacle in Cornwall, England

See also
 Rundell (disambiguation)